Arie Alter is a former Israeli footballer who later worked as the chairman of the IFPA (Israel Football Players' Association).

Honours
Championships
1982–83, 1985-1986, 1987-1988
League Cup
1982–83, 1983–84
Israeli Supercup
1983
UEFA Intertoto Cup
1983

References

1961 births
Living people
Israeli footballers
Israel international footballers
Maccabi Herzliya F.C. players
Hapoel Tel Aviv F.C. players
Maccabi Jaffa F.C. players
Hapoel Tiberias F.C. players
Hapoel Be'er Sheva F.C. players
Hapoel Ramat Gan F.C. players
Maccabi Netanya F.C. players
Footballers from Herzliya
Association football goalkeepers